The Austin Area Catholic Schools is a group of affiliated Catholic schools in Austin, Minnesota, United States.

References

External links
 Official website

Private schools in Minnesota
Schools in Mower County, Minnesota

`